Luina is a rural locality in the local government area (LGA) of Waratah–Wynyard in the North-west and west LGA region of Tasmania. The 2016 census recorded a population of nil for the state suburb of Luina.

History 
Luina was gazetted as a locality in 1966. Previously known as Whyte River, the current name was in use by 1914. It is believed to be an Aboriginal word for “blue headed wren”.

The area was the site of a tin mining town in the early 1900s.

Geography
Most of the boundaries are ridge lines.

Road infrastructure 
Route B23 (Waratah Road) runs through from east to west.

References

Towns in Tasmania
Localities of Waratah–Wynyard Council